Frashtan (Greek: Φράστανη) is a settlement in the former Dropull i Poshtëm municipality, Gjirokastër County, southern Albania. At the 2015 local government reform it became part of the municipality Dropull. It is within the larger Dropull region. 

The settlement lies at the foot of Mali i Gjerë and is bordered to the south by Lugar and to the north by Goricë. East of the village is Glinë.

Demographics 
In the Ottoman register of 1520 for the Sanjak of Avlona, the village was attested as a timar under the authority of  Ali, the son of Mehmed. The village had a total of 95 households and the anthroponymy attested almost entirely belonged to the Albanian onomastic sphere, characterised by personal names such as Bardh, Deda, Gjin, Gjon, Kola, Leka and others. The village also had one Muslim household, that of Haxhi Ibrahi, whose land was in the possession of a certain Çoban Ali.

Today it is mostly populated by a Greek population.

The village today 
Many of the inhabitants of the settlement migrated to nearby Greece following the downfall of Enver Hoxha's regime.

Gallery

References 

Populated places in Dropull
Greek communities in Albania
Villages in Gjirokastër County